Chorthippus pullus is a species belonging to the family Acrididae, subfamily Gomphocerinae. It is found across much of Europe

References

pullus
Orthoptera of Europe
Insects described in  1830